Drückebergergasse (English: "Shirker's Alley") is the popular name for Viscardigasse, a narrow, curbless pedestrian street, just over fifty metres long and paved with cobblestones throughout, in Munich, Germany. The street is officially named after the Swiss Baroque architect Giovanni Antonio Viscardi, but took its nickname from the 1930s, when locals could circumvent the nearby Nazi memorial to the martyrs of the 1923 Beer Hall Putsch, thus avoiding the requirement to render a Hitler salute to the guarded structure.

The alley has a memorial to those who resisted such Nazi tyranny, installed in 1995, in the form of a line of bronze cobbles, "" (English: "Arguments"). It was designed by the artist .

References

Streets in Munich
Society of Nazi Germany